Bahmai County is in Kohgiluyeh and Boyer-Ahmad province, Iran. The capital of the county is the city of Likak. At the 2006 census, the county's population was 35,067 in 6,583 households. The following census in 2011 counted 37,048 people in 8,536 households. At the 2016 census, the county's population was 38,136 in 10,028 households.

Administrative divisions

The population history of Bahmai County's administrative divisions over three consecutive censuses is shown in the following table. The latest census shows two districts, four rural districts, and one city.

References

 

Counties of Kohgiluyeh and Boyer-Ahmad Province